"Seen It All" is a song by American rapper Jeezy, released as the second single from his seventh studio album Seen It All: The Autobiography (2014). It is a hip hop song and it features vocals from fellow rapper Jay-Z and was produced by Cardo.

Charts

Weekly charts

Year-end charts

Certifications

References

2014 songs
2014 singles
Jeezy songs
Jay-Z songs
Def Jam Recordings singles
Song recordings produced by Cardo (record producer)
Songs written by Jay-Z
Songs written by Cardo (record producer)
Songs written by Jeezy